Santa is a Mexican telenovela produced by Irene Sabido for Canal de las Estrellas in 1978.

Cast 
Tina Romero as Santa
Manuel Ojeda as Federico Gamboa
Sergio Jiménez as Hipolito
Alicia Palacios as Elvira
Luis Miranda as Jarameño
Rosenda Monteros as La Gaditana
Mario Casillas as Ceferino
Margarita Sanz
Magda Guzmán
Arturo Beristáin
Dina de Marco

References

External links 

Mexican telenovelas
1978 telenovelas
Televisa telenovelas
Spanish-language telenovelas
1978 Mexican television series debuts
1978 Mexican television series endings